Richard Tipper or Tupper (fl. 1709 – after 1742) was an Irish scribe.

Biography
Richard Tipper lived at Mitchelstown, parish of Castleknock, County Dublin. According to Paul Walsh (priest)

"He has left a considerable body of MSS., which are now divided between Dublin and the British Museum. The earliest known to Mr. Robin Flower is dated 1709, and contains Lives of Saints ... A collection of tales in his handwriting was completed in 1713, while Edward O'Reilly was in possession of a MS  made by him in 1742."

"Perhaps his most ambitious effort is the incomplete transcript of the Book of Ballymote which is now in the Library of Trinity College, Dublin, and runs to no less than 622 pages. It bears the dates 1727 and 1728. Edward O'Reilly Edward O Reilly, speaking of its contents, says, that "to the industry of Tipper, the Irish scholar and antiquarian is indebted for many copies of ancient MSS., which he made from originals that are either not extant, or are locked up in libraries from the public."" Tipper left no Irish composition of his own."

See also
 Seon Mac Solaidh
 Tadhg Ó Neachtain
 John Fergus
 Charles O'Conor (historian)

References

External links
 Gleanings from Irish manuscripts, National Library of Scotland
 Dib.cambridge.org

Irish scribes
People from County Dublin
18th-century Irish writers
18th-century Irish male writers
Irish-language writers
Irish scholars and academics